Always Remember I Love You is a 1990 television film starring Patty Duke and Stephen Dorff, produced by Gross-Weston Productions in association with Stephen J. Cannell Productions. It tells the story of a teenage boy who, after finding out he was adopted, runs away from home to search for his biological family.

Plot
Shortly after Robert Mendham (played by Stephen Dorff) turns 16, he finds out from his parents (David Birney and Joan Van Ark) that he was not only adopted, but stolen from his childhood home (a fact unknown by his parents until that time).
He then runs away from home to search for his biological parents and ends up in a small town in Ohio where, using the public library files, he tracks down his mother Ruth Monroe (Patty Duke) and father Earl (Richard Masur). He then manages to befriend his biological brother and get taken in as a runaway by them, while trying to find out where he belongs, all the while keeping his true identity from them.

Cast
 Patty Duke as Ruth Monroe
 Stephen Dorff as Robert Mendham
 Joan Van Ark as Martha "Marty" Mendham
 Richard Masur as Earl Monroe
 David Birney as Philip Mendham
 Sam Wanamaker as Grandfather Mendham
 Jarred Blancard as John Monroe
 Linda Darlow as Fran
 Kimberley Warnat as Sally Monroe

Home video releases
The movie was released on VHS in the UK in 1991 by Odyssey Pictures.

External links
 
 Always remember I love you, movie trailer

1990 television films
1990 films
1990s English-language films
Films about adoption
American drama television films
Films directed by Michael Miller (director)
1990s American films